The FINA Marathon Swim World Series, known as the 10 km Marathon Swimming World Cup until 2017, is a series of 10-kilometer, open water swimming races held annually since 2007. Prior to 2007, 10K races were held as part of the FINA's Open Water Grand Prix series; post split, this latter series is now for races over 10 kilometers in length. Prizes and points are awarded for each race in the series, with the points being added together for an overall point standing (and overall awards).

Names for individual editions of the World Series have varied over time, with titles including Marathon Swimming World Cup, Marathon Swim World Series, and Open Water Tour.

In October 2010, the eighth and final race of the series in Fujairah, UAE made news following the death of the USA's Fran Crippen during the race. In December 2021, at the final leg of the year's World Series, a 4×1500 metre mixed relay event was debuted as part of the Abu Dhabi Aquatics Festival.

Overall winners

See also
FINA World Open Water Swimming Championships
Open Water Swimmers of the Year

References

External links
FINA 10 km Marathon Swimming World Cup 

 
Open water swimming competitions
Marathon Swimming World Cup
Marathon Swimming World Cup
FINA Marathon Swim World Series